Aymeri de Montesquiou-Fezensac (born 7 July 1942 in Marsan, Gers) was a member of the Senate of France, representing the Gers department. He is a member of the Republican Party. Since 1976, he is the mayor of Marsan. President of the Franco-Iranian Friendship organisation.
He was allowed to change his name to Aymeri de Montesquiou-Fezensac d'Artagnan on May 18, 2011.

References

1942 births
Living people
Radical Party (France) politicians
French Senators of the Fifth Republic
Mayors of places in Occitania (administrative region)
Senators of Gers